Fruit soju is a flavored form of soju, an alcoholic drink originally from Korea. In 2015, Sunhari, the first fruit-flavored soju brand was released by beverage manufacturer Lotte Chilsung.

History 
Before the first fruit soju was released, standard soju was popular in Korea as an alcoholic drink for adults. However, some people found soju difficult to drink due to its high alcohol content and strong flavor. Its popularity declined because of Korean societal changes regarding work, which resulted in people not having enough time to drink.

In 2015, the first fruit soju, Sunhari, was released. It was flavored with citron and had a lower alcohol content compared to traditional soju, making it popular with younger consumers. After Sunhari had become popular in the soju market, other companies released their own versions. Joenday released three types; Chamisle released Jamongisle, a grapefruit flavored soju that became as popular as Sunhari. Sunhari retained the strong taste of traditional soju, whereas Jamongisle offered a sweeter, milder taste.

The popularity of fruit soju continued for a year after the release of Sunhari, however in March 2016, sales decreased as the hype that first surrounded fruit soju disappeared. Today, fruit soju is not consumed often, and consequently, it is no longer widely available. Currently, sparkling soju is preferred over all other types of this beverage.

Some of Korea's fruit soju brands were released in the United States, including Dew on Jamong (자몽에 이슬) and Sunhari. Lotte Chilsung released Sunhari (순하리) in LA and Colorado, USA, exporting 9,600 boxes (20 bottles per box) in February 2016, and 150,000 boxes in March 2016. A Korean company located in Ohio produced three flavours of fruit soju.

Characteristics 

Fruit soju has a distinct fruit flavor and lower alcohol content compared to standard soju. The beverage comes in a variety of flavors, such as blueberry, grapefruit, lemon and apple. Special limited editions of fruit soju have been produced, such as a 9,000 bottle limited release batch of C1 Lime soju from the alcohol company Daesun Jujo (대선주조).

Fruit soju contains large amounts of sugar, with each bottle containing . The calorie content of each bottle of fruit soju totals 400 kcal; more calories than one bowl of rice and  more sugar than a serving of Coke, contributors to obesity and an increase of visceral fat.

A 2016 article identified the most popular fruit soju for university students as Dew on Grapefruit (자몽에 이슬), with students indicating they preferred this less-sweet version of the beverage. The second-most popular fruit soju in this demographic was Bokbadeun Brother (복받은 부라더).

Brands 
These are the main brands of fruit soju:

See also 
 Flavored liquor

References 

 Fruit drinks
 Soju